Koloni is a small town and seat of the commune of Niantaga in the Cercle of Koutiala in the Sikasso Region of southern Mali.

References

Populated places in Sikasso Region